The 2019 Copa del Rey de Baloncesto was the 83rd edition of the Spanish King's Basketball Cup. It was managed by the ACB and was held in Madrid, in the WiZink Center in February 2019. Barça Lassa defended successfully the title and conquered its second consecutive cup, 25th overall.

All times were in Central European Time (UTC+01:00)''.

Qualified teams
The top seven ranking teams after the first half of the 2018–19 ACB regular season and one team from the Community of Madrid qualified for the tournament. As one team from the Community of Madrid, Real Madrid, was among the seven highest ranking teams, the second highest ranking team from the Community of Madrid, Movistar Estudiantes, entered the Copa del Rey.

Draw
The 2019 Copa del Rey de Baloncesto was drawn on 21 January 2019 at approximately 12:00 and was broadcast live on YouTube and on TV in many countries. The seeded teams were paired in the quarterfinals with the non-seeded teams. There were not any restrictions for the draw of the semifinals. As in recent seasons, the first qualified team plays its quarterfinal game on Thursday.

Bracket

Quarterfinals

Iberostar Tenerife vs. Unicaja

Barça Lassa vs. Valencia Basket

Kirolbet Baskonia vs. Divina Seguros Joventut

Real Madrid vs. Movistar Estudiantes

Semifinals

Barça Lassa vs. Iberostar Tenerife

Real Madrid vs. Divina Seguros Joventut

Final
After wasting a 15-point difference in the last quarter, Real Madrid's Sergio Llull took the game to the overtime with a two-pointer with only three seconds left.

In the extra time and with ten seconds left, a hard contact of Anthony Randolph to Chris Singleton was not sanctioned with a foul and in the next play, Jaycee Carroll scored a 2+1 for allowing Real to take the lead. In the last play, Randolph blocked the shot of Ante Tomić but the referees sanctioned a goaltending despite watching it in the instant replay.

After the match, Real Madrid threatened to leave the ACB.

References

External links
Copa del Rey official website
Copa del Rey news

Copa del Rey de Baloncesto
2018–19 in Spanish basketball cups
February 2019 sports events in Spain
2019 in Madrid